"One More Day" is the fifth and final single from the Home Again album. It was released in the US with a B-side featuring a Darkchild remix to "Something About You". Ricky Bell and Ralph Tresvant were the lead vocalists. All six members were featured as background vocalists.

Ricky Bell posted a tweet in 2017 about why he was the only one featured in the video, stating that the rest of the group "protested".

Track listing

 One More Day (Single Edit without Dialogue) – 3:57
 Something About You (Dark Child Remixed Radio Version with Az Yet) – 3:31

Credits
Ronnie DeVoe – background vocals
Bobby Brown – background vocals
Ricky Bell – lead vocals and background vocals
Michael Bivins – background vocals
Ralph Tresvant – co-lead vocals and background vocals
Johnny Gill – background vocals

References

New Edition songs
Songs written by Jimmy Jam and Terry Lewis
1997 singles
Song recordings produced by Jimmy Jam and Terry Lewis
1996 songs
Songs written by Al Jackson Jr.
Songs written by Booker T. Jones
Songs written by Steve Cropper
MCA Records singles